Chênggo is a township in Gonggar County, Tibet Autonomous Region of China. It lies at an altitude of 4,744 metres (15,567 feet).

See also
List of towns and villages in Tibet

Notes

Populated places in Shannan, Tibet
Gonggar County
Township-level divisions of Tibet